Chamechaude is the highest summit in the Chartreuse Massif in the Isère department in eastern France. It is the fourth most prominent mountain in metropolitan France.

Ascent
The ascent is a hike, but there are also several climbing routes on the east face.

See also
List of Alpine peaks by prominence

References

External links
 "Chamechaude, France" on Peakbagger

Mountains of the Alps
Mountains of Isère
Two-thousanders of France